The Nebraska Cornhuskers football team competes as part of the NCAA Division I Football Bowl Subdivision, representing the University of Nebraska–Lincoln in the West Division of the Big Ten. The team is coached by Matt Rhule, who was named Nebraska's thirty-first head coach on November 26, 2022.

Six past Nebraska head coaches have been inducted into the College Football Hall of Fame: Eddie N. Robinson, Fielding H. Yost, Dana X. Bible, Biff Jones, Bob Devaney, and Tom Osborne. Osborne is the program's all-time leader in most major categories; his .836 career winning percentage is fourth-highest in major college football history. Thirteen Nebraska coaches have won a conference championship at the school, and Devaney and Osborne combined to win five national titles.

The program's first extended period of success came under the leadership of W.C. Cole and Ewald O. Stiehm. Between 1900 and 1916, Nebraska had five undefeated seasons and completed a stretch of thirty-four consecutive games without a loss, still a program record. Despite a span of twenty-one conference championships in thirty-three seasons, the Cornhuskers did not experience major national success until Devaney was hired in 1962. In eleven seasons as head coach, Devaney won two national championships, eight conference titles, and coached twenty-two All-Americans, but perhaps his most lasting achievement was the hiring of Osborne as offensive coordinator in 1969. Osborne was named Devaney's successor in 1973, and over the next twenty-five years established himself as one of the best coaches in college football history with his trademark I-form offense and revolutionary strength, conditioning, and nutrition programs. Following Osborne's retirement in 1997, Nebraska cycled through five head coaches before hiring Matt Rhule in 2022.

Coaching history

† Interim head coach

‡ Claimed national titles in bold

Notes

References

General

Nebraska

Nebraska Cornhuskers football coaches